Atrichantha is a genus of flowering plants in the family Asteraceae.

There is only one known species, Atrichantha gemmifera, endemic to the Cape Province of South Africa.

formerly included
Atrichantha elsiae Hilliard, Synonym of Hydroidea elsiae (Hilliard) P.O.Karis

References

Gnaphalieae
Monotypic Asteraceae genera
Endemic flora of South Africa